Hideaki Takashiro (born 22 February 1959) is a sailor from Tokyo, Japan who represented his country at the 1992 Summer Olympics in Barcelona, Spain as crew member in the Soling. With helmsman Kazunori Komatsu and fellow crew member Yasuharu Fujiwara they took the 12th place.

References

Living people
1959 births
Sailors at the 1992 Summer Olympics – Soling
Olympic sailors of Japan
Sportspeople from Tokyo
Japanese male sailors (sport)